The DVW Husky is a handheld British rugged computer issued in 1981 by DVW Electronics.

The Husky was designed to be used in harsh conditions, such as wet and cold weather, by users such as the military. It is waterproof and can be dropped from a considerable height onto a hard surface without sustaining damage.

The computer is handheld, with a membrane keyboard similar to that of the ZX81, and a 32x4 alphanumeric LCD. The Husky's CPU is compatible with the Z80, and the computer has built-in Basic, 32K non-volatile RAM, and 16K ROM. It was initially manufactured in response to a request from Severn Trent and was later used by the Ministry of Defence in the Rapier Missile project.

It was superseded by the Husky Hunter in 1983. The Hunter has a chiclet keyboard, 40x8 display, 48K ROM, and up to 208K RAM. Several Husky variants existed for specific applications.

Reception
BYTE in 1985 described the Husky as "the first lap-held computer". The writer reported that the Hunter "makes every other computer that I've handled feel quite flimsy", and concluded that "not everyone needs one, but if you do, you really need one".

References

External links
 Old Computers Museum

Portable computers